The Eton crop is a type of very short, slicked-down crop hairstyle for women.  It became popular during the 1920s because it was ideal to showcase the shape of cloche hats.  It was worn by Josephine Baker, among others. The name derives from its similarity to a hairstyle allegedly popular with schoolboys at Eton.

The Eton crop appears to have emerged in Britain in the mid-1920s: the first use of the phrase in The Times is in September 1926.  It was a severe hairstyle, emphasising the shape of the head and focusing interest on the face.  By June 1927 Margot Asquith, Lady Oxford, was deriding it: "Women with neither backs nor tops to their heads, and faces as large as hams, appear at the King's Drawing Rooms with the nuque of their necks blue from shaving..".  By 1930 it seems to have become outmoded among the most fashionable.  A critic reviewing a collection of society portraits notes: "Hairdressing is in a state of transition.  There is an Eton crop, there are many soft shingles, and there are a few heads where the hair is being let grow."

It was the choice haircut for the more masculine lesbians in the lesbian subculture, particularly in England, during its time of popularity.

See also
 List of hairstyles

References

External links
 

Hairstyles
1920s fashion